A Man Has Been Stolen (French: On a volé un homme) is a 1934 French comedy thriller film directed by Max Ophüls and starring Lili Damita, Henri Garat and Raoul Marco.

It was shot at the Joinville Studios in Paris. The film's sets were designed by the art director Max Heilbronner. The film was produced by Erich Pommer, recently escaped from Nazi-controlled Germany, for the European subsidiary of Fox Film. Many of the filmmakers employed were refugees from Nazi Germany.

Pommer also produced another film simultaneously Liliom, a romance film directed by Fritz Lang. Ophüls later suggested that he felt that the two directors had each been assigned to the wrong production "had we exchanged the films Lang most likely would have made an extraordinary mystery and I a very good romantic comedy". Neither film was very successful at the box office. It is a lost film.

Synopsis
A millionaire is kidnapped, but begins to fall in love with the woman keeping him prisoner.

Cast
 Lili Damita as Annette 
 Henri Garat as Jean de Lafaye 
 Raoul Marco as Inspector 
 Charles Fallot as Victor
 Lucien Callamand as Legros 
 Nina Myral as Old Woman 
 Pierre Labry as Balafre 
 Fernand Fabre as Robert 
 Robert Goupil as Legros 
 Pierre Piérade as Remy 
 Guy Rapp
 André Siméon

References

Bibliography 
 Hardt, Ursula. From Caligari to California: Erich Pommer's Life in the International Film Wars. Berghahn Books, 1996.
 Williams, Alan L. Republic of Images: A History of French Filmmaking. Harvard University Press, 1992.

External links 
 

French comedy thriller films
1934 films
1930s French-language films
Films directed by Max Ophüls
Fox Film films
Films shot at Joinville Studios
1930s comedy thriller films
French black-and-white films
1934 comedy films
1930s American films
1930s French films